WPBS (1040 kHz) is an commercial AM radio station licensed to the city of Conyers, Georgia.  It broadcasts a Vietnamese language music and talk radio format for the Atlanta media market. The station is considered a Class D AM radio facility by the Federal Communications Commission, operating with 50,000 watts of power during the daytime, and 5,500 watts during critical hours (around sunrise and sunset) using a non-directional antenna.  The station must sign off after local sunset to avoid interference to WHO in Des Moines, Iowa which is a Class A clear channel station on the same frequency.

The radio station WPBS (AM) is not related to the Watertown, New York-based PBS TV station WPBS-TV or the Public Broadcasting Service.

History
The station signed on 1050 kHz in 1979 as WCGA.  The format was a locally produced and formatted CHR.  It became automated as WTPO in 1986.  The format then became gospel as WPBE ("Praise 1050") in 1989.  In September 2003, the station changed operating frequency from its original 1050 kHz to its current dial position on 1040 kHz.  In May 2005, the station changed its programming format from gospel music to the "Planeta X" Spanish talk radio format (which moved from 1310 WPBC).

In early 2008, it changed formats to "Spice Radio Atlanta" broadcasting with Desi/Hindi music and talk.

By mid-2009, the station was simulcasting with 1080 WFTD's "Atlanta Radio Korea" programming. The Korean programming of "Atlanta Radio Korea" was then heard exclusively on WPBS and dropped from WFTD which then started carrying Spanish language programming.

When Atlanta Radio Korea, owners of WPBS, purchased WQXI from Entercom and flipped it to from its simulcast of WSTR on December 15, Vietsong Media, owners of WFTD, purchased WPBS and has flipped the format to Vietnamese radio, as of January 1, 2017.

External links
Official Website

PBS
Radio stations established in 1979
1979 establishments in Georgia (U.S. state)
Korean-language radio stations in the United States
PBS